The  is a large pumped-storage hydroelectric power station in Tochigi Prefecture, Japan. 
The facility is run by the Tokyo Electric Power Company (TEPCO).
The power plant started operation in July 1988 with a capacity of 350 MW (one unit operational). 
The other two units entered operation in December 1991.
The plant is one of the many large scale pure pumped-storage plants built in Japan since the 1970s to compensate for the increased penetration of base-load nuclear power and peak load from cooling and air-conditioning.

Like most pumped-storage facilities, the power station uses two reservoirs, releasing and pumping as the demand rises and falls. 
The upper reservoir is contained by the Imaichi Dam, a concrete gravity dam, at an altitude of 512 m. The reservoir is fed by the Togawa river.
The lower reservoir is contained by the Kuriyama Dam, a rock-fill embankment dam at an altitude of 1054 m.
The reservoirs can store  of water. 
Of that storage volume,  can be used for power generation.
This is enough for about 7 hours of operation at full generation capacity, giving a total energy storage capacity of about 7.35 GWh.

The power plant is housed in a large cavern 400 m underground and includes three 350 MW Francis reversible pump-turbines.
The cavern dimensions are 33.5 m width, 51 m height, and 160 m length.
The power station work on a daily or weekly storage cycle.
The plant is connected to the high voltage transmission system with a 500 kV power line. 
These power lines constituted the world's first practical applications of 500 kV XLPE (cross-linked polyethylene) cables, together with the power connection at the Shimogo Pumped Storage Power Station.

See also 

 List of power stations in Japan
 Hydroelectricity in Japan
 List of pumped-storage hydroelectric power stations

Notes

Pumped-storage hydroelectric power stations in Japan
Energy infrastructure completed in 1988
1988 establishments in Japan